The Netherlands Institute for Art History or RKD (Dutch: RKD-Nederlands Instituut voor Kunstgeschiedenis), previously Rijksbureau voor Kunsthistorische Documentatie (RKD), is located in The Hague and is home to the largest art history center in the world. The center specializes in documentation, archives, and books on Western art from the late Middle Ages until modern times. All of this is open to the public, and much of it has been digitized and is available on their website. The main goal of the bureau is to collect, categorize, and make art research available, most notably in the field of Dutch Masters.

Via the available databases, the visitor can gain insight into archival evidence on the lives of many artists of past centuries. The library owns approximately 450,000 titles, of which ca. 150,000 are auction catalogs. There are ca. 3,000 magazines, of which 600 are currently running subscriptions. Though most of the text is in Dutch, the standard record format includes a link to library entries and images of known works, which include English as well as Dutch titles.

The RKD also manages the Dutch version of the Art and Architecture Thesaurus, a thesaurus of terms for management of information on art and architecture. The original version is an initiative of the Getty Research Institute in Los Angeles, California.

History
The collection was started through bequests by Frits Lugt, art historian and owner of a massive collection of drawings and prints, and Cornelis Hofstede de Groot (1863–1930), a collector, art historian and museum curator. Their bequest formed the basis for both the art collection and the library, which is now mostly housed in the Koninklijke Bibliotheek (National Library).

Open access website
Though not all of the library's holdings have been digitised, much of its metadata is accessible online. The website itself is available in both a Dutch and an English user interface.

Online artist pages
In the artist database RKDartists, each artist is assigned a record number. To reference an artist page directly, use the code listed at the bottom of the record, usually of the form: https://rkd.nl/en/explore/artists/ followed by the artist's record number. For example, the artist record number for Salvador Dalí is 19752, so his RKD artist page can be referenced.

Online artworks pages
In the images database RKDimages, each artwork is assigned a record number. To reference an artwork page directly, use the code listed at the bottom of the record, usually of the form: https://rkd.nl/en/explore/images/ followed by the artwork's record number. For example, the artwork record number for The Night Watch is 3063, so its RKD artwork page can be referenced.

Online thesaurus of art terms
The Art and Architecture Thesaurus also assigns a record for each term, but these can not be referenced online by record number. Rather, they are used in the databases and the databases can be searched for terms. For example, the painting called The Night Watch is a militia painting, and all records fitting this keyword (Dutch: algemene trefwoord) can be seen by selecting this from the image screen.

The thesaurus is a set of general terms, but the RKD also contains a database for an alternate form of describing artworks, that today is mostly filled with biblical references. This is the iconclass database. To see all images that depict Miriam's dance, the associated iconclass code 71E1232 can be used as a special search term.

References

External links

Direct link to the databases (artists, images, literature)
The Dutch version of the Art and Architecture Thesaurus

Art history
Dutch culture
Libraries in The Hague
Open-access archives
Photo archives in the Netherlands
Buildings and structures in The Hague
Education in South Holland